Lagoa (English: Lagoon) is an affluent residential neighborhood in Rio de Janeiro, Brazil located around the Rodrigo de Freitas Lagoon. It borders the neighborhoods of Ipanema, Leblon, Copacabana, Gávea, Jardim Botânico, and Humaitá.

It is the third most expensive neighborhood to live in South America. It is also one of the few places in Rio de Janeiro without a favela (slum). The population is of about 18,200 inhabitants. Around the Rodrigo de Freitas Lagoon there is a 7.5 km long cycleway and many parks.

References

Neighbourhoods in Rio de Janeiro (city)